The Concert Hall (1752–1869) was a performance and meeting space in Boston, Massachusetts, located at Hanover Street and Queen Street. Meetings, dinners, concerts, and other cultural events took place in the hall.

Brief history

Architecture
According to some, Stephen Deblois built the hall in 1752. The Concert Hall building occupied a lot on Hanover Street that had changed owners several times through the years, beginning from the earliest days of Boston in the mid-17th century.  "The site was first known as Houchin's Corner, from a tanner of that name who occupied it."  Owners included: Gilbert and Lewis Deblois (1749); Stephen Deblois (1764); William Turner (1769); John and Jonathan Amory (1789-ca.1798).

At some point after 1787, architect Charles Bulfinch re-modelled the building ("new interior and enlarged," according to his notes). Around 1798, it was a "brick house, three stories, thirty windows, value $3000."  It "underwent various alterations until torn down in 1869, to make way for the widening of Hanover Street."

Events
Concert Hall served multiple functions, mainly as a venue for groups of people to gather to hear concerts, and to attend meetings and formal dinners. The Freemasons met there from the 1750s until at least 1818. In January, 1755, the Boston News-Letter advertised "a concert of musick" at the hall, tickets four shillings. The hall may have had "a small organ by the London builder John Snetzler from 1763 to 1774."

John Rowe, a merchant who built Boston's Rowe's Wharf, attended events at the Concert Hall and kept notes in his diary:March 16, 1769: "Spent the evening at the Fife Major's concert at Concert Hall; there was a large and genteel company and the best musick I have heard performed there."
March 23, 1770: "Went in the evening to the Concert Hall to hear Mr. Joan read the Beggars Opera and sing the songs; he read but indifferently, but sung in taste; there were upwards one hundred people there."
Jan. 3, 1771: "Spent the evening at Concert Hall, where there was a concert performed by Hartly Morgan and others; after the concert a dance. The Commodore [i.e., James Gambier?] and all the captains of the navy here was there, and Colo. Dalrymple, and fifty or sixty gentlemen and the same number of ladies present."
Jan. 18, 1771: At the dinner on the Queen's birthday at Concert Hall ... there was "very good dancing and good musick, but very bad wine and punch." 
Oct. 15, 1771: "I spent the former part of the evening at the Concert Hall, it being Mr. [David] Propert's concert; a good company, upwards of 200."

Josiah Flagg (b.1737) performed concerts at the hall. "On June 7, 1770, Flagg gave... a "Grand concert" that, though the full program was not listed in the newspapers, was to include "a duet to be sung by a Gentleman who lately read and sung in Concert-Hall, and Mr. Flagg. ...The program for Flagg's...concert on May 17, 1771, was printed in The Massachusetts Spy the day before the event. This notable program... at Concert Hall, included four vocal pieces, three overtures, two concertos, three 'symphonies,' and a violin solo. The bulk of the program was composed of works by such lesser composers as Stanley, Schwindl, Abel, and Ricci, but also included music by Stamitz, Handel, and J.C. Bach." In addition to performing, Flagg also organized some events at the hall. In February, 1771, Flagg presented works by Bach and Handel, performed by violinist W.S. Morgan, and the 64th Regiment Military Band.

Other concerts included one by David Propert, organist at Trinity Church, who gave a concert on October 15, 1771. In 1774, Mr. Selby "... played a harpsichord concerto in concerts sponsored by W. S. Morgan."

The Concert Hall was also used for dancing classes. Charles Pelham (b.1722) advertised dancing lessons in 1762: "Charles Pelham hereby informs all the Gentlemen and Ladies in Town and Country that he proposes again to open a Dancing School on Monday the third day of May next, at Concert Hall, where he will give constant Attendance as usual, every Monday, Thursday and Saturday in the Afternoon, provided he may meet with suitable encouragement." Later, "Thomas Turner had a dancing and fencing academy there in 1776."

Several balls took place at the hall in the 1770s. For instance, "the fourth Subscription Ball will be held at Concert Hall on Thursday, the 29th instant [of January], 1776." Also: "on Monday, the 11th of March, will be given at Concert Hall, a Subscription Masked Ball. By the fifth of March, a number of different masks will be prepared & sold by almost all the milliners and mantua makers in Town." "Governor John Hancock gave, in 1778, a grand ball in Concert Hall to the officers of D'Estaing's fleet, at which three hundred persons were present."

From ca.1789 through 1846, the Society of the Cincinnati of Massachusetts held annual meetings at the hall.

The ordination of Chandler Robbins (1810–1882) as a minister of the Second Church was celebrated at the Concert Hall in December 1833. One attendee wrote in his diary: "The dinner was sumptuous; but it was the first ordination I ever attended where there was no wine, nor even cider, nor indeed anything to drink but water; excepting that in the midst of dinner coffee was served round to such as desired it."

A number of non-musical entertainments took place in the 19th century. Ventriloquist Jonathan Harrington performed in March 1831. In March, 1834, the "500-lb. 8-year-old" Rose Rich appears at the hall. In September, 1835, "161-year-old" Joyce Heth appears; she was "George Washington's former nurse."

Staff
As for staff, "James Vila took charge of Concert Hall in 1789," and continued as "keeper" for many years, until at least 1803. Tilley Whitcomb was associated with the hall around 1805. For many years Peter Bent Brigham (1807–1877) oversaw the hall, probably beginning around 1837. Around 1840, Henry Hannington (ca.1803-1857) worked as "proprietor of the celebrated Dioramas as exhibited at Concert Hall"

Timeline of selected events
 1770
 "A new song composed by a Son of Liberty and sung by Mr. Flagg"
 The Beggar's Opera, performed by Mr. Joan [i.e. James Juhan]
 The Mock Doctor by Henry Fielding, presented by Mr. Joan [i.e. James Juhan]
 Damon and Phillida by Colley Cibber; selections from Artaxerxes by Thomas Arne; A Hymn to  the Moon, from the Opera of Cynthia"
 Selections from Lionel and Clarissa by Isaac Bickerstaffe and Charles Dibdin
 1771
 Organ concerto by Mr. Selby [i.e. William Selby, or possibly John Selby]
 Concert of selections from Handel's Acis and Galatea, presented by Josiah Flagg
 1774
 Harpsichord concerto performed by Mr. Selby [possibly John Selby]; sponsored by W. S. Morgan
 Concert of selections from Artaxerxes performed by W.S. Morgan.
 1788
 Musical Society
 Concert by Mr. Deverill and Master Brewer, vocalists
 1791
 Concert by Mr. and Mrs. Solomon, vocalists ("much to be commended, and certainly much to be amended")
 1792
 The Evening Brush by John Collins, performed by Charles Stuart Powell
 1794
 Mr. Baker performs "dramatic olios"
 1795
 Concert of works by Haydn, Hook, and others, performed by Bartlett, Berkenhead, Clifford, Collins, Jones, Stone
 1804
 Mr. Rannie, sword-swallower, ventriloquist. "Mr. R. has a very surprising fish, which will perform deceptions that cannot fail to astonish every beholder. This fish will pick up any card in the pack that may only be thought of. Twenty ladies or gentlemen may draw cards from the pack, the fish will immediately draw each lady and gentlemen's card without making the smallest mistake."
 1805
 Concert by Gottlieb Graupner
 Concert of "vocal and instrumental music, interspersed with various recitations" performed by "Mr. & Mrs. Fox; Messrs. Bates, Mallet and Shaw, assisted by the Band of Music under Mr. Everdell"
 1806
 Boston Light Infantry dinner
 1811
 Ball on anniversary of Washington's birthday
 "Mr. Turner's annual exhibition and ball"
 Winslow Blues dinner
 "Mr. Schaffer's annual ball and exhibition of his scholars' acquirements"
 Washington Monument Association meeting
 1812
 Constitutional Club meeting
 1813
 "Public dinner ... to Gen. Dearborn"
 1815
 "Splendid dinner" for "General Miller, in testimony of his gallant and distinguished services on the frontiers of Upper Canada"
 Concert of works by Arne, Haydn, King, Pleyel, Rosetti, Shield, Wainwright, Paul Wranitzky performed by Mr. Turner, Mrs. Graupner, T. Granger, Mr. Bray, Miss C. Graupner, Mr. McFarland
 Masonic funeral of John Warren
 1816
 Concert of works by Berton, Martini, Plantade performed by Messrs. Gilles & Etienne
 "Exhibition of the scholars of Mr. Carter"
 "Mr. Turner's exhibition of dancing"
 1817
 Company of Independent Cadets anniversary dinner
 1818
 Cincinnati dinner, "entertainment served up by Mr. Forster in a stile of great elegance"
 Levees by "Miss Hartley, the Albanese lady"
 Maritime Theatre
 "The Soul of the Soldiery celebrated their anniversary ... among their guests ... were the vice president of the United States, the governor of the Commonwealth, and other gentlemen"
 1819
 Sword-swallower Ramo Samee ("native of Seringapatam")
 Performance by Mr. Brunel
 "Picturesque representation by Mr. Ardenond"
 Friends of American Manufactures meeting
 Oration on Masonry by "a lady"
 1820
 Meeting "relative to the recent decision of Congress on the Missouri Question"
 1821
 Debating Society meeting
 Convention of Congregational Ministers dinner
 1822
 Lecture by Mr. Artiguenave
 1823
 Exhibition of painting "Wreck of the Albion"
 Friends of Domestic Woolen Manufactures meeting
 1824
 Washington Society dinner
 Massachusetts Charitable Society meeting, Thomas Melvill, president
 1825
 Franklin Typographical Society anniversary
 Exhibition of pictures by Mr. Fisher

References

Further reading

 George Brayley. Early instrumental music in Boston. The Bostonian. 1894-1895.

Cultural history of Boston
Music venues in Boston
Demolished buildings and structures in Boston
West End, Boston
19th century in Boston
18th century in Boston
Government Center, Boston
1752 establishments in Massachusetts
Buildings and structures demolished in 1869